Congregation Sherith Israel ("loyal remnant of Israel") is one of the oldest synagogues in the United States. It was established during California’s Gold Rush period and reflects the ambitions of early Jewish settlers to San Francisco. Today it is a congregation widely known for its innovative approach to worship and lifecycle celebrations and is part of the movement of Reform Judaism. Its historic sanctuary building is one of San Francisco's most prominent architectural landmarks and attracts visitors from all over the world.

Sanctuary building 
In the 1890s, Congregation Sherith Israel faced the prospect of outgrowing its 1870 Gothic Revival-style synagogue on Post Street. Heeding this realization, congregational leaders first secured property on the northeast corner of California and Webster Streets on September 8, 1902, then hired École des Beaux Arts-trained architect Albert Pissis to draw up plans for a new temple. Ground was broken on October 8, 1903, and the cornerstone was laid on February 22, 1904. The sanctuary was officially consecrated on September 24, 1905. While improvements have been made through the ensuing years, the building has been preserved close to its original construction.

Temple Sherith Israel, a fusion of Byzantine and Romanesque forms, cost $250,000 to build in 1904–1905. The sanctuary's interior contains  of space, 3,500 organ pipes, nearly 1,400 seats, 1,109 decorative light bulbs, more than 89 ornamental leaded glass windows and 32 arched clear glass windows in its outer drum.

During the 1906 earthquake, the building sustained only modest damage which was quickly repaired. It was also undamaged during the 1989 Loma Prieta earthquake. Nonetheless, the State of California has mandated that unreinforced masonry structures like Temple Sherith Israel must meet stringent seismic resilience standards. In 2005, the congregation commenced a seismic retrofit of the sanctuary, funded through an ambitious capital campaign. The retrofit was completed in 2017.

History and congregational life

The Gold Rush and Jewish pioneers 
The history of Congregation Sherith Israel is also San Francisco’s history: Gold Rush, fire, earthquake, scandal, war and yet another earthquake. In 1848, the village of Yerba Buena lay poised between Mexican rule and American annexation. Then gold was found 140 miles away at Sutter's Mill. Meanwhile, Jews in Central Europe lived under repressive regimes that constrained employment, forced military conscription and restricted marriage. Understandably, many enterprising young Jews did not see much of a future for themselves in their homelands. Drawn by the lure of wealth, freedom and opportunity, California became their new Promised Land.

The founding of Congregation Sherith Israel 
In September 1849 – months after the discovery of gold but still a year before California achieved statehood – a small band of Jewish pioneers gathered in a wood-frame tent. Although lacking a rabbi and Torah scrolls, they were determined to celebrate Rosh Hashanah and Yom Kippur.

These young Jews came from Prussia, Bavaria, England, France and the eastern United States. They worshiped together again during Passover and the High Holy Days in 1850, formed two benevolent societies to aid the needy and bought land for a cemetery.

In April 1851, San Francisco’s frontier Jews met again, this time to establish a permanent congregation and elect officers. In typical fashion they split almost immediately, forming not one but two synagogues: Congregation Sherith Israel followed the minhag Polen, the traditions of Jews from Posen in Prussia, while Congregation Emanu-El chose to worship according to the German practices of Jews from Bavaria. The synagogues have been friendly neighbors ever since.

The birth of a Reform Jewish institution 
As San Francisco boomed, keeping Sherith Israel housed proved a considerable challenge. The congregation’s first temporary meeting place, like much of the city, was destroyed by the "Great Fire" of 1851. After losing its next home to yet another of the conflagrations that routinely swept through the city during those early years, Sherith Israel's members built the temple's first house of worship on Stockton Street between Broadway and Vallejo in 1854 at a cost of $10,000.

So many Jews had departed Europe for San Francisco that, by the end of the 1850s, upwards of six percent of the city’s population was Jewish – a higher percentage (briefly) than in New York. After the Civil War, another generation arrived to seek its fortune in California. In 1870, Congregation Sherith Israel moved to a Gothic-style structure on Post and Taylor Streets, where it remained for 34 years.

Initially Orthodox in the Polish style, Sherith Israel took major steps toward becoming a Reform congregation during this period. In a visible departure from tradition, the Post Street sanctuary was designed for mixed seating. Gradually, with much discussion and struggle, wearing a kippah became optional, Friday evening services were initiated, a choir introduced and a new prayerbook chosen. Two dynamic rabbis hastened the move toward Reform: Rabbi Henry Vidaver (1873–1882) and Rabbi Jacob Nieto (1893–1930). In 1903, as ground was broken for the current site on California Street, Congregation Sherith Israel made these changes official and joined the Union of American Hebrew Congregations, now known as the Union for Reform Judaism.

Congregational leadership 
Under the leadership of many nationally prominent rabbis, Sherith Israel has been a long-standing advocate for social justice in the Jewish community and for the many diverse multicultural communities that call San Francisco home.

Present clergy 
 Senior Rabbi Jessica Zimmerman Graf
As director of congregational engagement for Synagogue 3000 from 2006 to 2014, Rabbi Graf was on the cutting edge of synagogue renewal and transformation, working with congregations around the country. A graduate of Columbia University, she was ordained by Hebrew Union College in New York in 2003. She has worked in congregations from New York to Juneau, Alaska, and is active in several major Jewish organizations.

At Sherith Israel, Rabbi Graf served for two years as director of Magalim (circles of Jewish community).  She focused on designing programs to create new dimensions of Jewish practice involving Jews from their 20s through their 40s  in learning, prayer and shared experience. She helped deepen connections among people who are already members of the Sherith Israel community and brought new people into our congregational family. Rabbi Graf sees many opportunities to “do Jewish” in small-group settings where people interact and discuss important topics.

Rabbi Graf wanted to be a rabbi since she was 15. However, her path to the rabbinate included some unusual twists and turns. During her junior year in Florence studying art history, she spent time exploring small Jewish communities to learn as much about them as she could. After college she worked for a professor of astronomy and astrophysics. The job took her to an observatory in the Chilean Andes to count light particles. “There I was at the top of a mountain in the Andes taking pictures of the night sky, which I’ve since paired with Jewish texts,” comments Rabbi Graf.

Rabbi Graf has been delighted to return to Congregation Sherith Israel. “It’s a privilege to be here in a place that I care so much about both personally and professionally,” she notes. “To have come home to be part of a wonderful team fashioning Judaism for the future of San Francisco is very exciting.”

 Cantor Tobias Glaser
Toby grew up in the Deep South in Melbourne, Australia. He studied at the University of Melbourne, majoring in German and Music History with a Diploma of Modern Languages in French. After working as a cantorial soloist at several Reform synagogues in Australia, he pursued his passion for Jewish music at Hebrew Union College first in Jerusalem in 2015, and then in New York, graduating in 2020. He sang as a student cantor at Greenwich Reform Synagogue in Connecticut as well as East End Temple in New York, before working as Cantorial Intern at Congregation Rodeph Sholom in Manhattan for three years. He has also taught at Central Synagogue, Temple Shaaray Tefila and the Jewish Community Project Downtown. Cantor Glaser has always had a passion for classical music and has studied with leading voice teachers both in Australia and Germany and performed with many of Australia’s leading opera companies including Victorian Opera, Melbourne Lyric Opera, Melbourne Chorale, and numerous choirs and vocal ensembles. In his worship services, Cantor Glaser loves infusing traditional and well-loved melodies with contemporary flare, leading the community in a variety of musical styles with percussion instruments and guitar. His style is always eclectic, but draws heavily on traditional prayer modes and Jewish chant with an emphasis on improvisation and innovation. In his spare time he enjoys walking along the beautiful trails in the Bay Area, as well as trying out new bars and restaurants. In the future he hopes to spend time at the many museums, concerts and events which make San Francisco such a dynamic and wonderful place to live.

Past clergy

Rabbis 
 Henry A. Henry (1857–1863)
Henry A. Henry was Congregation Sherith Israel's first rabbi. Early in his tenure, he took up the cause of Edgardo Mortara, a Jewish boy in Bologna, Italy who had been secretly baptized by his nurse. This incident sparked international outrage among Jews when police, under orders from Pope Pius IX himself, abducted the child and refused to return him to his parents. San Francisco responded in full: more than 3,000 people attended a protest meeting. Rabbi Henry later chaired a group that was formed to draft resolutions which called on the U.S. government to cooperate with European countries in their "endeavors to suppress religious intolerance and persecution".

 Jacob Nieto (1893–1930)
Rabbi Jacob Nieto was the leading Bay Area rabbi of his day. Raised in a Sephardic family in Jamaica and a noted speaker, Rabbi Nieto stood at the center of almost every major crisis and cause during his four-decade term of service. He intervened in the Abe Ruef scandal, led relief efforts after the 1906 earthquake and fire, and defended labor organizer Thomas Mooney, wrongly convicted of an anarchist bombing in 1916. He stood up for the disadvantaged, advocated for women’s rights, supported organized labor, opposed the death penalty and objected to World War I as an imperialist venture. A religious reformer, Rabbi Nieto presided over the building of the California Street temple and guided Sherith Israel to prominence among San Francisco congregations.

 Jacob J. Weinstein (1930–1932)
Rabbi Jacob Weinstein, an alumnus of Reed College and a Labor Zionist, was so passionate about social issues that the city’s poor and unemployed often flocked to Sherith Israel just to hear his engaging sermons. His views proved too extreme for the congregational community at the time, however, and he was eventually forced to resign after supporting a dockworkers' strike in 1932. He subsequently departed San Francisco for Chicago, where he became one of America’s most respected Reform rabbis. His later career also included a stint as president of Central Conference of American Rabbis.

 Morris Goldstein (1932–1972)
Remembered more for scholarship than social activism, Rabbi Morris Goldstein turned his attention inward to the congregation during World War II and the post-war era. Sherith Israel's temple house building – now Newman Hall – was built during his tenure, and he was instrumental in growing membership and programs, which solidified Sherith Israel’s place as a vital part of San Francisco’s Jewish community. While at Sherith Israel, Rabbi Goldstein focused his research endeavors upon the relationship of Jesus to the Judaism of his day, earning a doctorate and publishing the book Jesus in the Jewish Tradition in 1950. Goldstein's work on Jesus and the Sanhedrin continues to be quoted in scholarship on the subject.

 Martin Weiner (1972–2003)
Not only did Rabbi Martin Weiner reinvigorate the congregation, attracting many new families and the newly defined cohort of singles to California Street, but he was also known for his quest for social justice and his activism on behalf of civil rights, human rights and Soviet Jewry. He has been engaged with Israel through the years, speaking his mind as the situation in the Middle East has developed. Rabbi Weiner sat on the San Francisco Human Rights Commission for many years, as well as on the boards of many Jewish organizations. During the 1980s under Rabbi Weiner and, in the 1990s with Rabbi Alice Goldfinger, Sherith Israel developed model programs to feed the homeless and the homebound. A leader in the national Reform movement, he mentored many associate rabbis who went on to congregational careers throughout the U.S. He also served as the president of the Central Conference of American Rabbis and sat on the editorial committee for the Reform movement’s new prayerbook, Mishkan T'filah.

 Larry Raphael (2003-2016)
Rabbi Raphael shepherded the congregation from strength to strength during a time of generational change in San Francisco and the American Jewish world. His lasting legacy includes creating a big tent for Judaism at Sherith Israel's Reform congregation, building community in a city of changing demographics and culture, and committing to the challenge of bringing the historic synagogue into compliance with the city’s seismic retrofit mandate. Rabbi Raphael is, was, and always will be a teacher. His plans after Sherith Israel include teaching at the Fromm Institute and at Lehraus Judaica. He also will work with faith leaders on important issues affecting the lives of San Francisco residents as a board member of the San Francisco Interfaith Council. Rabbi Raphael will also volunteer with the Bay Area Jewish Healing Center.

Cantors 
 Martin Feldman (1960–2003)
Cantor Emeritus of Congregation Sherith Israel, Martin Feldman was born 1928 into a musical family in Newark, New Jersey and frequently sang in Orthodox synagogue choirs as a young boy. He attended Montclair State Teachers College and received a vocal scholarship from the David Mannes School of Music in New York City. In 1958, he graduated from Hebrew Union College with a degree in sacred music and received a certificate qualifying him to be a religious school administrator. After serving Congregation Beth Abraham in Tarrytown, New York, Cantor Feldman came west in 1960 to become cantor of Congregation Sherith Israel, where he served for 43 years. He is a past president of the Northern California Board of Cantors and has served on the National Board of the American Conference of Cantors. Cantor Feldman received a vocal scholarship from the Opera Department at the San Francisco Conservatory of Music in 1965, as well as an honorary doctorate in music from Hebrew Union College in 1998. About singing in Sherith Israel’s historic sanctuary, Cantor Feldman says, "To chant in the sanctuary was always a spiritual experience. With the music, the dome and the artwork telling the story of our people, one blends in and becomes part of thousands of years of Jewish tradition."

 Rita Glassman (2003–2012)
Cantor Rita Glassman began learning Torah from her parents, Holocaust survivors from Lithuania and Czechoslovakia, who stressed the importance of Jewish education and values, modeling mitzvot and love of Torah. She drew particular inspiration from weekly synagogue visits with her father where she heard famous cantors from his native Vilnius, including Moshe Koussevitzky. During her junior year of college, Cantor Glassman studied abroad at the Jerusalem Academy of Music and Dance and Hebrew University of Jerusalem, majoring in musicology and Jewish studies. She received her investiture as a cantor from the Hebrew Union College in New York City in 1985 and later completed the first program for cantors at the Institute of Jewish Spirituality. Before joining Congregation Sherith Israel, she worked for congregations in New York, Pennsylvania and Iowa, as well as Bay Area congregations Beth Sholom in San Francisco and Rodef Sholom in Marin County. Cantor Glassman has also served on the Yad B'Yad Task Force of the World Union for Progressive Judaism with an emphasis on outreach to Jewish communities in Latin America. In addition to her love for chazzanut – the cantorial art – Cantor Glassman composes and records songs both in Hebrew and English in folk, pop and country music styles. Her most recent album, Journey to Shabbat, a collection of contemporary Jewish prayer melodies, was recorded in the temple's historic sanctuary.
 David Frommer (2016-2020)
Cantor David Frommer became part of the Sherith Israel family on July 1, 2016. He grew up in Manhattan and, following his family’s move, graduated from high school in Kentucky. He received his B.A. with honors in History from Yale University. There, he sang with Magevet, Yale’s Jewish A Cappella Group, performing across the US and internationally in Canada, Europe and the UK. After college, David volunteered for fifteen months as a combat soldier in the Nachal Infantry Division of the Israel Defense Forces, where he served with distinction in the West Bank. During the next five years he pursued his cantorial studies at Hebrew Union College-Jewish Institute of Religion's Debbie Friedman School of Sacred Music in New York. He also trained as a chaplain at the US Army Chaplain Center and School at Fort Jackson, South Carolina. Following his investiture, Cantor Frommer deployed overseas as the first cantor to serve as a chaplain in the US military. He provided religious support for Jewish soldiers and civilians stationed in Afghanistan, Kuwait, Jordan and Qatar. In the US, he has served synagogues in Plano, Texas; Port Washington, New York; and Santa Rosa, California. While leading the music program and engaging in a variety of clerical activities at Sherith Israel, he is excited to continue serving the soldiers of the California Army National Guard. Cantor Frommer’s approach to Jewish worship favors spirited communal participation with moments for cantorial expression and musical dialogue between the cantor and the congregation. He cites strong influences by melodic traditions of Jewish composers as diverse as Louis Lewandowski from 19th-century Germany and Shlomo Carlebach from 20th-century America. He enjoys using a variety of methods to teach melodies and the Hebrew words that accompany them.

See also 

 Hills of Eternity Memorial Park

Notes

References 

 
 
  [From the original, published 1901–1906]
 
 
  [From Three Years in America (1862), Hanover]

External links 

 Union for Reform Judaism directory of congregations: Congregation Sherith Israel
 PlanitJewish.com – San Francisco Bay Area: Congregation Sherith Israel
 Discovering San Francisco – Churches and temples
 Bancroft Library Online Archive of California at UC Berkeley: Congregation Sherith Israel records, 1851–2003
 Judah L. Magnes Museum at UC Berkeley: Sherith Israel records, 1851–2000
 Wiss, Janney, Elstner Associates projects: Sherith Israel – Seismic assessment and strengthening

Synagogues in San Francisco
Reform synagogues in California
Polish-Jewish culture in the United States
National Register of Historic Places in San Francisco
Synagogues on the National Register of Historic Places in California
Religious organizations established in 1851
1851 establishments in California
Synagogues completed in 1905
1900s architecture in the United States
Beaux-Arts architecture in California
Beaux-Arts synagogues
Byzantine Revival architecture in California
Byzantine Revival synagogues
Romanesque Revival architecture in California
Romanesque Revival synagogues